Jolgeh-ye Khalaj  or Jolgeh Khalaj may refer to:

Jolgeh-ye Khalaj-e Olya
Jolgeh-ye Khalaj-e Sofla